The 1994–95 B Group was the 40th season of the Bulgarian B Football Group, the second tier of the Bulgarian football league system.

A total of 32 teams contested the league: 16 in the North B Group and 16 in the South B Group. Spartak Varna finished top of the North Group and Levski Kyustendil finished top of the South Group. Rakovski Ruse were promoted through the play-off.

North B Group

South B Group

Promotion play-off

References

External links 
 1994–95 Bulgarian B Group season 

1994-95
Bul
2